Andre Wadsworth (born October 19, 1974) is a former football defensive end. He played College football for Florida State University, and earned All-American honors. He was selected in the first round of the 1998 NFL Draft by the Arizona Cardinals.

Early years
Wadsworth was born in St. Croix, U.S. Virgin Islands.  He attended Class A Florida Christian School in Miami-Dade County, Florida, where he starred at tight end for the Florida Christian Patriots high school football team.  Wadsworth was named first-team All-Dade County and voted all-conference and second-team all-state as a defensive lineman.  He also returned a kickoff  98 yards for a touchdown.

College career
Wadsworth was recruited by only one small college, Stony Brook in New York.  Wadsworth decided to attend Florida State University, and played for the Florida State Seminoles football team as a walk-on and eventually earned an athletic scholarship.  He received second-team All-Atlantic Coast Conference (ACC) honors his freshman, sophomore and junior seasons (1994–1996) as a defensive tackle.  Despite being a potential top-10 NFL Draft pick after his junior season, he stayed for his senior year, citing a pinched nerve in his neck that forced him out of four games in 1996 as a concern regarding his physical capabilities to perform for scouts at full capacity.

He switched from defensive tackle to left defensive end for his senior season, registering 59 tackles, 19 tackles for a loss and 16 quarterback sacks, placing him second in both categories in the school's all-time records. One of four finalists for the Lombardi Award, he was named first-team All-ACC and a consensus first-team All-American.  He was also selected ACC Player of the Year, and ACC Defensive Player of the year in 1997.

Professional career

1998 NFL Draft
Wadsworth bench pressed 500 pounds and had a personal best in the squat of 690. The Steelers' college personnel director, Tom Modrak, said: "He's like a missile when he comes off the ball. He can keep his pads low and still run full speed. He's flexible, and he's around 280 pounds."

Wadsworth was regarded as the No. 1 prospect in the 1998 NFL Draft. He was selected 3rd overall by the Arizona Cardinals.

Arizona Cardinals
A lengthy holdout ensued, centered almost directly on both his demand to be paid closer to the contracts signed by the two previous picks, Indianapolis Colts' Peyton Manning out of University of Tennessee at No. 1 and the San Diego Chargers' Ryan Leaf from Washington State University at No. 2 rather than one closer to Heisman Trophy winner Charles Woodson selected by the Oakland Raiders at No. 4, and a provision allowing him to void the contract before expiration if he chose to do so.  The holdout lasted until the night before the season-opener (44 days) with a six-year, $42 million contract including a $10.49 million signing bonus (Manning received $11.6 million on a $48 million contract, Leaf got $11.2 million on a five-year contract totaling $31.2 million), though the player-triggered option out was never consummated.

He played in all 16 games his rookie season, finishing with 5.0 sacks and 57 tackles, including 42 solo.  Bothered by a knee injury in 1999, he still managed to play in 11 games, tallying 2.0 sacks, 26 tackles, and his only career interception.  Off-season knee surgery, the second of his career, held him out from most of the off-season activities, but still managed 13 tackles and one sack in nine games.  At the conclusion of the 2000 season, Wadsworth underwent microfracture surgery on his right knee, the third surgery on that knee in his career, and arthroscopic surgery on the left on January 3 with non-team physician Richard Steadman.  Possibly due to concerns after teammate Eric Swann's semi-recovery from nine knee surgeries, the Arizona Cardinals released Wadsworth before offering a one-year, $512,000 tender that was eventually pulled off the table within days after it went unsigned.

On January 28, 2007 the St. Petersburg Times reported that the Tampa Bay Buccaneers were planning to give Wadsworth, now 32, a workout. The New York Jets gave Wadsworth a workout later in the offseason. On March 26, 2007, the New York Jets signed Wadsworth to a minimum-based salary contract. Wadsworth was also said to be healthy enough to compete for an outside linebacker position. On September 1, 2007, the Jets released him.

NFL statistics

Key
 GP: games played
 COMB: combined tackles
 TOTAL: total tackles
 AST: assisted tackles
 SACK: sacks
 FF: forced fumbles
 FR: fumble recoveries
 FR YDS: fumble return yards 
 INT: interceptions
 IR YDS: interception return yards
 AVG IR: average interception return
 LNG: longest interception return
 TD: interceptions returned for touchdown
 PD: passes defensed

References

1974 births
Living people
All-American college football players
American football defensive ends
Arizona Cardinals players
Florida State Seminoles football players
United States Virgin Islands players of American football
People from Saint Croix, U.S. Virgin Islands